Nehriq (also Romanized as Nehrīq; also known as Nahrigh, Nehrlīq, Nīrīkh, and Nyrykh) is a village in Ozomdel-e Shomali Rural District, in the Central District of Varzaqan County, East Azerbaijan Province, Iran. At the 2006 census, its population was 592, in 120 families.

References 

Towns and villages in Varzaqan County